Nokia 150 and Nokia 150 Dual Sim are Nokia-branded entry-level mobile phones from HMD Global. Originally introduced in December 2016 by Nokia as the first device by HMD Global, the 150 supports one Mini-SIM card and 150 Dual Sim supports two Mini-SIM cards.

The Nokia 150 has a flashlight. Display is 2.4 inches with QVGA 320x240 resolution. It is a TFT panel with 65K colours. It supports vibration, has a loudspeaker and a 3.5mm standard headphone jack.

Wireless connectivity includes only 2G, no WiFi and support for Bluetooth 3.0. This may pose a problem in some countries like Singapore where 2G is no longer in use.

It does not have the threaded view or conversations layout of text messages. It has a microUSB port for charging and microSD slot for extra data storage.

The 1020mAh removable battery rated for 25 full days (600h) of standby and 22 hours of call time

It has a 0.3MP fixed focus rear camera with video recording capability.

It has audio/video playback support.

It has 2 games: Snake Xenzia and Nitro Racing. However, some Nokia 150 units sold in certain regions do not have the Nitro Racing game.

It comes with black and white colors.

Specifications 

Nokia 150 runs on an updated Series 30+ UI. The Nokia 150 and 150 Dual both are expected to provide the user with very long use times.

See also 
 Nokia 3-digit series
 Nokia 100
 Nokia 101
 Nokia 103
 Nokia 106
 Nokia 6

References

External links 
 Official
 Nokia 150, nokia.com
 Other
 Nokia 150, gsmarena.com

150
Mobile phones introduced in 2016
Mobile phones with user-replaceable battery